Pas Qaleh (also Romanized as Pas Qal‘eh and Pas Qalleh; also known as Past Qal‘eh) is a village in Rudbar-e Qasran Rural District, Rudbar-e Qasran District, Shemiranat County, Tehran Province, Iran. At the 2006 census, its population was 153, in 47 families.

References 

Populated places in Shemiranat County